Claire Mathon (born 1975) is a French cinematographer. Her work includes The Queen of Hearts, Going South, and Stranger by the Lake. Mathon photographed Portrait of a Lady on Fire, for which she received a César Award for Best Cinematography.

Career
She studied film at the École nationale supérieure Louis-Lumière and graduated in 1998. Since then, she has worked on several short films, documentaries and feature films. She was nominated for the César Award for Best Cinematography for the film Stranger by the Lake.

In 2019, Mathon won the Los Angeles Film Critics Association Award for Best Cinematography for her work on the films Atlantics and Portrait of a Lady on Fire.

Mathon also won the Lumières Award for Best Cinematography and the César Award for Best Cinematography for Portrait of a Lady on Fire.

Filmography

Feature films

Short films

Documentary films

Television

References

External links

1975 births
Living people
French cinematographers
French women cinematographers
Place of birth missing (living people)
César Award winners